Windermere Island is a small island in The Bahamas approximately 5.5 miles (8,8 kilometres) long.

The island is connected to the larger island of Eleuthera by a short bridge that is protected by a guardhouse. The bridge was built by Lord Trefgarne, who was the former owner of the island. The adjoining waters and flats of Savannah Sound are considered to be a premier bonefishing location, and Windermere's 5-mile-long beach is protected by a 5-mile-long reef that is rich in fish and underwater flora. It is also located in the same bay as Camp Bahamas. There are numerous animals around the island, including sand crabs and whale sharks.

The island is populated with private homes and holiday rental properties. Diana, Princess of Wales, and Charles III spent their 1981 honeymoon on the island. Famous residents have included Jacques-Yves Cousteau, The Duke and Duchess of Abercorn (James Hamilton, 5th Duke of Abercorn), Toni Braxton, India Hicks, and the family of Lyndon B. Johnson. 

In April 2008, singer-songwriter Mariah Carey and comedian Nick Cannon were married at Carey’s private residence on the island.

Geography 
Windermere Island is adjacent to the larger island of Eleuthera. The two islands are connected by a bridge. Windermere island offers white sandy beaches, bright blue waters, and unnaturally planted Arecaceae trees.

References 

Islands of the Bahamas